The 1991 South Asian Games (or 5th SAF Games) were held in Colombo, Sri Lanka from 22 December to 31 December 1991.

Sports 
  Athletics
  Basketball
  Boxing
  Football
  Shooting (debut)
  Swimming
  Table tennis
  Tennis (debut)
  Volleyball
  Weightlifting

Medal tally

References

South Asian Games
1991 South Asian Games
S
S
South Asian Games, 1991
1991 in Asian sport
Multi-sport events in Sri Lanka
Sport in Colombo